Avraham Albert Mandler (3 May 1929 – 13 October 1973) was an Israeli major general. In the 1967 Six-Day War he was a colonel commanding the 8th Mechanized Infantry Brigade. This brigade pushed "elements of the Shazli Force and the Egyptian 6th Division straight into an ambush laid by Arik Sharon" at Nakhl on June 8, 1967.

During the Yom Kippur War, Major General Mandler was commander of the IDF's armored forces in the Sinai. He was killed in action on 13 October 1973 by Egyptian hostile fire, possibly artillery fire. There are claims that this happened after his voice was intercepted and identified by Egyptian electronic warfare units using tactical COMINT equipment, who immediately transmitted his position to the nearest Second Army artillery battery, but this was disputed by Shmuel Gonen, who performed an experiment the very next day to show that the very brief time between the radio transmission and Mandler's death ("thirty seconds") was not long enough for such a process to have taken place.

References

1929 births
1973 deaths
Israeli generals
Austrian Jews
Austrian emigrants to Israel
Israeli military casualties of Yom Kippur War
Israeli military personnel killed in action
Burials at Kiryat Shaul Cemetery
Military personnel from Linz